The East Perth Football Club was an Australian rules football club, who was known as the original East Perth Football Club from 1891 before the East Perth from today was formed. The original East Perth club's record was far from illustrious, involving a mere two season stint (1891 and 1892) as members of the Western Australian Football Association, during which they managed just 1 win and 2 draws from a total of 24 matches, for a success rate of 8.3%.

References

Australian rules football clubs in Western Australia
Former West Australian Football League clubs